R708 road may refer to:
 R708 road (Ireland)
 R708 (South Africa)